Martapura is the capital of the Banjar Regency in South Kalimantan province, Indonesia. It is located close to the city of Banjarbaru (with which it forms a continuous built-up area) and it consists of three districts within the Regency - Martapura, West Martapura and East Martapura, with a combined population at the 2010 Census of 147,654 people. 

Originally this town was named "Kayutangi", which was the last capital of the former Sultanate of Banjar. The famous Banjarese ulema Sheikh Muhammad Arsyad al-Banjari, author of Sabilal Muhtadin, comes from this town. 

This town is famous as kota santri or the "city of santri (Muslim students)" in Kalimantan, because of the pesantren (Islamic boarding school) of Pondok Pesantren Darussalam Martapura. Martapura is often called "Veranda of Mecca" because there are many santris wearing white clothes in this town who walk up and down to study Islam, similar to Mecca in the hajj season.

This town is often visited by tourists because of its diamond industry center and the main diamond polishing in Kalimantan and provides many jewelry handicrafts.

Administration
Martapura comprises three of the districts (kecamatan) of Banjar Regency, listed below with their areas and their populations at the 2010 Census and according to the latest estimates (for mid 2017):

References

Populated places in South Kalimantan
Regency seats of South Kalimantan